The Other Woman is a 2018 spy novel by Daniel Silva. It is the eighteenth Gabriel Allon series and is set in a remote Andalusian village exploring the story of a Russian mole. It was released on July 17, 2018 and debuted at number 1 in the August 5 edition of the New York Times Bestseller list. It remained on the list for seven weeks through September 16.

References

External links
Daniel Silva - Official Website (Book: The Other Woman)

American spy novels
Novels by Daniel Silva
2017 American novels
HarperCollins books